Umeclidinium bromide (trade name Incruse Ellipta)  is a long-acting muscarinic antagonist approved for the maintenance treatment of chronic obstructive pulmonary disease (COPD). It is also approved for this indication in combination with vilanterol (as umeclidinium bromide/vilanterol) and also as a triple-therapy combination as fluticasone furoate/umeclidinium bromide/vilanterol.

It is on the World Health Organization's List of Essential Medicines. In 2020, it was the 245th most commonly prescribed medication in the United States, with more than 1million prescriptions.

References

External links 
 
 

Bromides
Drugs acting on the respiratory system
GSK plc brands
Muscarinic antagonists
Quaternary ammonium compounds
Quinuclidines
Bronchodilators